Luis Felipe Klinkert Maluhy (born 20 July 1977 in São Paulo) is a Brazilian racing driver. He currently competes in the Stock Car Brasil for the Bassani Racing team, driving by Peugeot. Maluhy also competes in the Brasileiro de Marcas for the Officer ProGP team, driving the Mitisubishi Lancer GT.

On fourth race in 2010 at Rio de Janeiro, he won the first victory in the category.

Complete Stock Car Brasil results
(key) (Races in bold indicate pole position) (Races in italics indicate fastest lap)

References

External links

1977 births
Living people
Brazilian racing drivers
Stock Car Brasil drivers
Formula Palmer Audi drivers
TC 2000 Championship drivers
Súper TC 2000 drivers
Racing drivers from São Paulo